The 1892 United States presidential election in California was held on November 8, 1892 as part of the 1892 United States presidential election. State voters chose nine representatives, or electors, to the Electoral College, who voted for president and vice president.

Incumbent President Benjamin Harrison’s administration had been plagued by divisions within his party and by controversy over foreign relations, notably with Italy and Chile. In California, Harrison became less popular because it was believed that Senator Leland Stanford was dictating policies in the interest of the Southern Pacific Railroad. Opposition to its power had already spawned several unsuccessful reform movements in California since 1873, and the growing Populist movement also gained substantial support from small farmers in the state’s Central Valley region. The relative weakness of partisan loyalties in California helped give the movement much more influence than in the East, however the much greater urban character of the state’s economy, the diversity of its agricultural sector and the access of its wheat growers – the basis for Populist victories in the Plains States – to major ocean ports severely weakened the Populist Party under 1880 Greenback nominee James B. Weaver in California. Consequently California would prove Weaver’s weakest state west of the Missouri River, giving him less than ten percent of the vote.

California voted for the Democratic challenger, former president Grover Cleveland, over the Republican incumbent, Benjamin Harrison by an extremely narrow margin of just 147 votes, or a 0.05452% margin, which constitutes the fifth-closest statewide presidential election result on record, behind Florida in 2000, Maryland in 1832 and 1904, and California itself 20 years later in 1912. Because the vote was so close and voters voted for individual electors, the ninth Cleveland elector received fewer votes than one Harrison elector, who was thus elected. This was the second occasion in which California's electoral vote was split, rather than being awarded to a single candidate. The first occasion was in 1880. Such a split would only subsequently occur in California two subsequent times (1896, and 1912). California is one of just three states that Cleveland won in 1892 but lost in his first two presidential elections, the others being Illinois and Wisconsin.

Results

Results by county

Notes

References

California
1892
1892 California elections